Ghulam Dastagir (born 24 July 1945 in Kabul) is a retired Afghan wrestler who competed in the 1968 Summer Olympics and in the 1972 Summer Olympics.

References

External links
 

1945 births
Living people
Sportspeople from Kabul
Olympic wrestlers of Afghanistan
Wrestlers at the 1968 Summer Olympics
Wrestlers at the 1972 Summer Olympics
Afghan male sport wrestlers